The 1994 United States Senate election in Tennessee was held November 8, 1994. Incumbent Democratic U.S. Senator Jim Sasser ran for re-election to a fourth term but was defeated by Republican nominee Bill Frist.

The election was held concurrently with the special election for the open Tennessee U.S. Senate seat, which had been held by Democrat Al Gore until his election as Vice President of the United States, and which was sought by Republican nominee Fred Thompson and Democratic nominee Jim Cooper; Thompson won in a decisive victory. As a result of Frist and Thompson's simultaneous victories in Tennessee, the two elections marked the first time since 1978 and the last time until 2021 that both Senate seats in a state have flipped from one party to the other in a single election cycle.

Major candidates

Democratic 
 Jim Sasser, incumbent U.S. Senator

Republican 
 Bill Frist, heart transplant surgeon from Nashville
 Bob Corker, Businessman from Chattanooga and future Senator for this same seat (2006)
 Steve Wilson
 Harold Sterling, Assessor from Shelby County, Tennessee
 Byron Bush, dentist
 Andrew Benedict

Campaign 
Heading into the election, Sasser was a three term incumbent, who had previously won his last two elections with over 60% of the vote. Sasses was also chair of the powerful Senate Budget Committee, and with the incoming retirement of Senate Majority Leader George Mitchell of Maine, Sasser was seen as the most likely candidate to succeed him, were he to have won a fourth term 

However, there were two unforeseen events that affected the campaign. One was the large scale of discontent that the American people seemed to have toward the first two years of the Clinton administration, especially the proposal for a national healthcare system largely put together and advocated by Clinton's wife, Hillary Clinton. The other was the somewhat unexpected nomination of Nashville heart transplant surgeon Bill Frist for the seat by the Republicans.

Frist, who had never voted until he was 36, was a political unknown and a total novice at campaigning, but was from one of Nashville's most prominent and wealthiest medical families, which gave him some name recognition, as well as adequate enough resources to match the campaign war chest built up by the three-term incumbent, a challenge most "insurgent" candidates find to be impossible. A further factor working to Frist's advantage was a simultaneous Republican campaign by actor and attorney Fred Thompson for the other Tennessee Senate seat, which was open due to Al Gore resigning to become Vice President of the United States. 

Another factor in Frist's favor was that Sasser was never seen as possessing much charisma of his own. During the campaign Nashville radio stations were derisive towards Sasser to the point of stating that he could only win "a Kermit The Frog lookalike contest." 

In one of the largest upsets in a night of political upsets in the November 1994 U.S. general elections, Frist defeated the incumbent Sasser by approximately 14 percentage points.

Results

See also 
 1994 United States Senate special election in Tennessee
 1994 United States Senate elections

References 

Tennessee
1994
1994 Tennessee elections